Mabel Walker Thornton (born December 11, 1928) is an American sprinter. She competed in the women's 100 metres at the 1948 Summer Olympics.

Thornton was born in Camden, in Wilcox County, Alabama, and attended Camden Academy, where she first ran track. She then joined the track team at Tuskegee University, and qualified for the 1948 Olympics after an AAU track meet.

References

External links
 

1928 births
Living people
Athletes (track and field) at the 1948 Summer Olympics
American female sprinters
Olympic track and field athletes of the United States
People from Camden, Alabama
Olympic female sprinters
21st-century American women